The 2020 All-Ireland Junior Ladies' Football Championship was the 38th contested edition of the Ladies' Gaelic Football Association's tertiary inter-county Ladies' Gaelic football tournament.

The impact of the COVID-19 pandemic on Gaelic games forced the delay of the tournament until late in the year.

Fermanagh LGFA were the winners for the second time in their history and will play in the All-Ireland Intermediate Ladies' Football Championship in 2021.

Format

Group stage

6 counties competed in the 2020 tournament. There were two groups of three. Each team played the other team's in their group once, earning three points for a win and one for a draw.

Knockout stage

The winner of group A competed in the All-Ireland semi-final against the runner up of group B, and the winner of group B played the runner up of group A.

Teams

Venues

Fixtures and results

Group A Table

Group A results

Group B Table

Group B results

All-Ireland Semi-finals

All-Ireland final

Awards

TG4 Junior Players' Player of the Year

Eimear Smyth  Fermanagh

Junior Team of the Championship

Season Statistics

See also

2020 All-Ireland Senior Ladies' Football Championship
2020 All-Ireland Intermediate Ladies' Football Championship
All-Ireland Junior Ladies' Football Championship
All-Ireland Senior Ladies' Football Championship
All-Ireland Intermediate Ladies' Football Championship
Ladies' Gaelic football
Ladies' Gaelic Football Association
Ladies' Gaelic Football All Stars Awards
Ladies' National Football League

References

2020 in Ladies' Gaelic football
2020 in women's sport
Ladies' All-Ireland Championship
2020 in Irish sport
Ladies' Gaelic football
Women's sport in Ireland
Women's sports competitions in Ireland
Women's team sports